In accounting, accrued interests are generally computed and recorded at the end of a specific accounting period as adjusting journal entries used in accrual-based accounting.

In finance, accrued interest is the interest on a bond or loan that has accumulated since the principal investment, or since the previous coupon payment if there has been one already.

For a type of obligation such as a bond, interest is calculated and paid in set intervals (for instance annually or semi-annually).  Ownership of bonds/loans can be transferred between different investors not just when coupons are paid, but at any time in-between coupons. Accrued interest addresses the problem regarding the ownership of the next coupon if the bond is sold in the period between coupons: Only the current owner can receive the coupon payment, but the investor who sold the bond must be compensated for the period of time for which he or she owned the bond. In other words, the previous owner must be paid the interest that accrued before the sale.

Formula 

The primary formula for calculating the interest accrued in a given period is:

 is calculated as follows:

The main variables that affect the calculation are the period between interest payments and the day count convention used to determine the fraction of year, and the date rolling convention in use.

A compounding instrument adds the previously accrued interest to the principal each period, applying compound interest.

External links 
 What is Accrued Interest ? In Hindi

References 
 Accrued Interest summary of the London Stock Exchange for bonds
 What is accrued interest? Definition for loans by peer-to-peer lender Funding Circle

Interest
Liability (financial accounting)
Bond valuation
Settlement (finance)

:fr:Obligation (finance)#Cours et coupon couru